Francis Edward "Frank" Doyle (17 June 1922 – 13 March 1984) was an Australian politician. He was a member of the Australian House of Representatives from 1972 to 1974, representing the electorate of Lilley.

Doyle was born in Oakey, Queensland. He worked as a train driver across regional Queensland and was Queensland state secretary of the Australian Federated Union of Locomotive Enginemen from 1958 to 1972. He was also a member of the state executive of the Labor Party. Doyle was an unsuccessful nominee for Labor Senate preselection in 1967 and was the unsuccessful Labor candidate for Lilley at the 1969 federal election, topping the primary votes but losing on Democratic Labor Party preferences.

He was elected to the House of Representatives at the 1972 federal election, defeating sitting Lilley MP and former minister Kevin Cairns by only 35 votes. He lost a rematch with Cairns at the 1974 election, and tried to reclaim his seat unsuccessfully at the 1975 election.

In March 1975, he was appointed as the first Queensland director of the Australian Trade Union Training Authority, serving in that role until his death in 1984.

References

Australian Labor Party members of the Parliament of Australia
Members of the Australian House of Representatives for Lilley
Members of the Australian House of Representatives
1922 births
1984 deaths
20th-century Australian politicians